Quintin Jones may refer to:

 Execution of Quintin Jones (1979–2021), American man executed in Texas
 Quintin Jones (American football) (born 1966), former American football safety player
 Quentin Jones (born 1983), English mixed-media artist